Abdolabad-e Kani Kabud (also romanized as ‘Abdolābād-e Kānī Kabūd and Abdolābād-e Kān Kabūd; also known as Abdolābād) is a village in Mirbag-e Shomali Rural District, in the Central District of Delfan County, Lorestan Province, Iran. At the 2006 census, its population was 56, in 11 families.
Kankaboud Olia or AbdulAbad Mirbag is a village in the central part of Delfan County in Lorestan Province, Iran. It is seven kilometers away from Noorabad city. It has a very mild climate. Most of the lands in this village are dry land. The village has 346 hectares of agricultural land (mainly rainfed), the main crops of which are wheat, peas and barley. The occupation of the villagers is mainly agriculture and to some extent animal husbandry. The lands known as Dareh garaki, which have been seized and registered as national lands by the Natural Resources Department of Delfan, belong to this village. Most of the villagers have their own gardens. In terms of water resources, it lives in relative poverty. It has a comprehensive health service center and many springs, the most important of which are Cheshmeh  Kamreh spring, Cheshmeh Pahneh spring, Kani Sore or Sorekh spring, Dariagho, etc.
This village is located in North Mirbag district and according to the census of Iran Statistics Center in 2005, its population was 56 people (eleven households). Of course, the population of the village now (2018) is more than 20 families and 100 people. In addition, a number of villagers have migrated to Khorram Abad and Noor Abad cities. The correct name of the village is Abdul Abad Konkabud. The villagers belong to one of three dynasties: Sheikhian, Abdian and Shahgol. This village has many educated people, some of whom are working as faculty members in the country's universities. Among these people is Dr. Ali Sheikhian, who has a doctorate in immunology and is a member of the board of immunology.

References 

Towns and villages in Delfan County